Luke Jones (born 18 January 1997 in Middle Swan) is an Australian-born, New Zealand professional squash player. As of August 2018, he was ranked number 165 in the world, and number 4 in New Zealand.

References

1997 births
Living people
New Zealand male squash players